The Eleven Little Roosters is an American spy comedy web series created by Josh Flanagan and co-directed and co-written by Blaine Gibson and Flanagan. It stars Zach Anner, Burnie Burns, Barbara Dunkelman, Gavin Free, Ashley Jenkins, Geoff Ramsey and Gus Sorola. It is the successor to the 2014 series Ten Little Roosters, acting as an spy thriller that pits international assassins against each other. It premiered on Rooster Teeth's website on January 16, 2017.

Format
After the success of Ten Little Roosters, creator Josh Flanagan wanted to "fully deliver" on the concept by expanding the cast, scope, and storyline and adding new levels of interaction, describing it as, "Avengers: Infinity War of Rooster Teeth." Each episode, characters are killed, and viewers who predict plot points by "synthesizing" clues such as hidden QR codes, in-dialogue hints, and audio cues win prizes. It feature cameos and 360 video segments.

Cast

 Zach Anner as Annersby, a non-combatant who assists Gavin at MI6
 Burnie Burns as Burnardo Burnadicci, of the Italian Defense Division
 Chris Demarais as Cristoph Weiss, from the Swedish Security Service
 Barbara Dunkelman as Agent Moose, a non-combatant from the Canadian Assassins League
 Adam Ellis as Comrade Hadam, of the Komitee for State Security
 Josh Flanagan as The Colonel, a non-combatant from the Rooster Corps
 Gavin Free as Gavin The 3rd, an MI6 agent
 Blaine Gibson as Agent Gibson, a CIA agent
 Bruce Greene as Brüce, a member of the Sex Von Shaukel Boyz
 Ryan Haywood as Ryan Haywood, a non-combatant and survivor of a similar situation.
 Matt Hullum as The Big Cock, non-combatant and leader of the Rooster Corps
 Ashley Jenkins as Agent Jinx, another CIA agent
 Michael Jones as Operator Mikey, a non-combatant who assists Gavin at MI6
 Adam Kovic as Koko, another member of the Sex Von Shaukel Boyz
 Miles Luna as La Luna Loco, a member of the Asesino Mexicano Espia
 Aaron Marquis as Marquee Marquis, of the French Association of Professionals
 Jack Pattillo as Jack the Red, of the Norwegian Viking Coalition
 Geoff Ramsey as Boomerang Geoff, from Whatever Australia Has
 Griffon Ramsey as The Griffon, from Whatever Australia Has
 Mariel Salcedo as Madam Mariel, from Asesino Mexicano Espia
 Lawrence Sonntag as Lars, the third member of the Sex Von Shaukel Boyz
 Gus Sorola as So'Rolla, from the Asesino Mexicano Espia
 Elyse Willems as Agent Knuckle, of the Canadian Assassins League
 James Willems as Wilhelm, the final member of the Sex Von Shaukel Boyz

Episodes

References

External links
 

Rooster Teeth
2017 web series debuts
American comedy web series